aka Contemporary Dictionary of Love: Age of Curiosity is a 1967 Japanese pink film directed by Shin'ya Yamamoto and featuring Naomi Tani in one of her earliest starring roles.

Synopsis
While an obscene audio tape is played, a young woman has sex. She becomes obsessed with the recording and can only achieve orgasm if she is listening to it. Complications ensue when her boyfriend  becomes troubled by the tape and is unable to perform sexually while it is being played.

Cast
 Naomi Tani
 Yumiko Matsumoto
 Miki Hayashi

Background and critical appraisal
Director Shin'ya Yamamoto filmed Memoirs of Modern Love: Curious Age for Mamoru Watanabe's Watanabe Pro and it was released theatrically in Japan by Tōkyō Kōei in 1967. They both later worked in Nikkatsu's Roman Porno films, but they did not work together in that series.

In their Japanese Cinema Encyclopedia: The Sex Films, Thomas and Yuko Mihara Weisser give Memoirs of Modern Love: Curious Age a rating of two-and-a-half out of four stars. They note that the plotline is "thin and ludicrous", and only an excuse for Tani to show her "primo body".

Bibliography

Notes

1967 films
1960s Japanese-language films
Pink films
1960s Japanese films